The Māṇḍūkya Upaniṣad is the shortest of all the Upanishads, and is assigned to Atharvaveda. It is listed as number 6 in the Muktikā canon of 108 Upanishads.

It is in prose, consisting of twelve short verses, and is associated with a Rig Vedic school of scholars. It discusses the syllable Aum; presents the theory of four states of consciousness; and asserts that Aum is Brahman – which is the Whole – and that Brahman is this self (ātman).

The Mandukya Upanishad is notable for having been recommended in the Muktikā Upanishad, through two central characters of the Ramayana, as the one Upanishad that alone is sufficient for knowledge to gain moksha, and as sixth in its list of ten principal Upanishads. The text is also notable for inspiring Gaudapada's Mandukya Karika a classic for the Vedanta school of Hinduism. The Mandukya Upanishad is among the often cited texts on chronology and the philosophical relationship between Hinduism and Buddhism.

Etymology
The root of Mandukya is sometimes considered as Manduka (Sanskrit: मण्डूक) which has several meanings. Some of its meanings include "frog", "a particular breed of horse", "the sole of horse's hoof", or, "Spiritual distress"  Some writers have suggested that "frog" is the etymological root for Mandukya Upanishad.

Another root for the Upanishad's name is Mānduka (Sanskrit: माण्डूक) which literally is "a Vedic school" or means "a teacher". Paul Deussen states the etymological roots of Mandukya Upanishad to be a "half lost school of Rigveda". This school may be related to the scholar named Hrasva Māṇḍūkeya, whose theory of semivowels is discussed in Aitareya Aranyaka of Rigveda.

Applying the rules of sandhi, the text is also called Mandukyopanishad.

Chronology and authorship

Chronology
The chronology of Mandukya Upanishad, like that of other Upanishads, is uncertain and contested. The chronology is difficult to resolve because all opinions rest on scanty evidence, an analysis of archaism, style and repetitions across texts, driven by assumptions about likely evolution of ideas, and on presumptions about which philosophy might have influenced which other Indian philosophies.

Several academics have dated the Mandukya Upanishad to the early centuries of the Common Era. The Japanese academic of Vedic, Hindu and Buddhist scriptures, Hajime Nakamura has dated the Mandukya Upanishad to "about the first or second centuries A.D." The scholar of South Asian religions, Richard E. King too has dated the Mandukya Upanishad at the first two centuries of the Common Era. Indologist and Sanskrit scholar Patrick Olivelle states, "we have the two late prose Upanisads, the Prasna and the Mandukya, which cannot be much older than the beginning of the common era".

Mahony, (writing for the MacMillan Encyclopedia of Religion) on the other hand, states that Mandukya Upanishad probably emerged in the late fifth and early fourth centuries BCE, along with Prashna and Maitri Upanishads. Phillips lists Mandukya Upanishad before and about the time the Shvetashvatara Upanishad, the Maitri Upanishad, as well as the first Buddhist Pali and Jaina canonical texts were composed. R D Ranade posits a view similar to Phillips, placing Mandukya's chronological composition in the fifth, that is the last group of ancient Principal Upanishads.

Chronological roots
The foundation of several theories in the Mandukya Upanishad are found in chronologically more ancient Sanskrit texts. For example, chapters 8.7 through 8.12 of Chandogya Upanishad discuss the "four states of consciousness" as awake, dream-filled sleep, deep sleep, and beyond deep sleep.

Authorship
The text of the Mandukya Upanishad is fully incorporated in the Mandukya Karika, a commentary attributed to the 6th century CE Gaudapada, and is not known to exist independent of this commentary. Isaeva states that some scholars, including Paul Deussen, presumed that Gaudapada may be its author; however, there is no historical or textual evidence for this hypothesis. Scholars consider Mandukya Upanishad as a Principal Upanishad with more ancient origins.

Structure
In contrast to the older Upanishads, the Mandukya Upanishad is very short, with clear and concise formulations. It has twelve short prose paragraphs.

Contents
The Mandukya Upanishad is an important Upanishad in Hinduism, particularly to its Advaita Vedanta school. It succinctly presents several central doctrines, namely that "the universe is Brahman," "the Self (Atma) exists and is Brahman," and "the four states of consciousness". The Mandukya Upanishad also presents several theories about the syllable Aum, and that it symbolizes self.

Aum in the Mandukya Upanishad

The Mandukya Upanishad opens by declaring, "Aum!, this syllable is this whole world". Thereafter it presents various explanations and theories on what it means and signifies. This discussion is built on a structure of "four fourths" or "fourfold", derived from A + U + M + "silence" (or without an element).

Aum as all states of time

In verse 1, the Upanishad states that time is threefold: the past, the present and the future, that these three are "Aum". The four fourth of time is that which transcends time, that too is "Aum" expressed.

Aum as all states of Atman

In verse 2, states the Upanishad, "this brahman is the Whole. Brahman is this self (ātman); that [brahman] is this self (ātman), consisting of four corners."

Aum as all states of consciousness

These four are A + U + M + "without an element" respectively.

Aum as all of etymological knowledge

In verses 9 to 12, the Mandukya Upanishad enumerates fourfold etymological roots of the syllable "Aum". It states that the first element of "Aum" is A, which is from Apti (obtaining, reaching) or from Adimatva (being first). The second element is U, which is from Utkarsa (exaltation) or from Ubhayatva (intermediateness). The third element is M, from Miti (erecting, constructing) or from Mi Minati, or apīti (annihilation). The fourth is without an element, without development, beyond the expanse of universe. In this way, states the Upanishad, the syllable Aum is the Atman (the self) indeed.

Four states of consciousness

The Mandukya Upanishad describes four states of consciousness, namely waking (jågrat), dreaming (svapna), and deep sleep (suṣupti),<ref group=web name=Om>[http://www.advaita.org.uk/discourses/downloads/om.pdf advaita.org.uk, Om' – three states and one reality (An interpretation of the Mandukya Upanishad)]</ref> which correspond to the Three Bodies Doctrine:
 The first state is the waking state, in which we are aware of our daily world. "It is described as outward-knowing (bahish-prajnya), gross (sthula) and universal (vaishvanara)". This is the gross body.
 The second state is the dreaming mind. "It is described as inward-knowing (antah-prajnya), subtle (pravivikta) and burning (taijasa)". This is the subtle body.
 The third state is the state of deep sleep. In this state the underlying ground of consciousness is undistracted, "the Lord of all (sarv'-eshvara), the knower of all (sarva-jnya), the inner controller (antar-yami), the source of all (yonih sarvasya), the origin and dissolution of created things (prabhav'-apyayau hi bhutanam)". This is the causal body.
 The fourth factor is Turiya, pure consciousness. It is the background that underlies and transcends the three common states of consciousness. In this consciousness both absolute and relative, saguna brahman and Nirguna Brahman, are transcended. It is the true state of experience of the infinite (ananta) and non-different (advaita/abheda), free from the dualistic experience which results from the attempts to conceptualise ( vikalpa) reality. It is the state in which ajativada, non-origination, is apprehended.

Theory and nature of Atman
The verses 3 through 7 discuss four states of Atman (Self).

Verse 3 of the Upanishad describes the first state of Self as outwardly cognitive with seven limbs, nineteen mouths, enjoying the gross, a state of Self common in all of human beings.

The Mandukya Upanishad, in verse 4, asserts the second state of Self as inwardly cognitive with seven limbs, nineteen mouths, enjoying the exquisite, a state of brilliant Self.

The Upanishad's verse 5 states the third state of Self as one without desire or anticipations, where pure conscience is his only mouth, where he is in unified cognition, enjoying the delight, a state of blissful Self.

The verses 6 and 7 of the Upanishad states the fourth state of Self as one beyond all the three, beyond extrospective state, beyond introspective state, beyond cognitive state, the state of ekatmya pratyaya sara (one with the Self), tranquil, benign, advaita (without second). He then is the Self, just Atman, the one which should be discerned.

Johnston summarizes these four states of Self, respectively, as seeking the physical, seeking inner thought, seeking the causes and spiritual consciousness, and the fourth state is realizing oneness with the Self, the Eternal.

Similarities and differences with Buddhist teachings
Scholars contest whether Mandukya Upanishad was influenced by Buddhist theories along with the similarities and differences between Buddhism and Hinduism in light of the text. According to Hajime Nakamura, the Mandukya Upanishad was influenced by Mahayana Buddhism and its concept of śūnyatā. Nakamura states, "many particular Buddhist terms or uniquely Buddhist modes of expression may be found in it", such as adrsta, avyavaharya, agrahya, acintya, prapancopasama. According to Randall Collins the Mandukya Upanishad "includes phrases found in the Prajnaparamitrasutras of Mahayana Buddhism."

According to Michael Comans, Vidushekhara also notes that the term prapañcopaśama does not appear in pre-Buddhist Brahmanic works, but in contrast to Nakamura he does not conclude that the term was taken over from Mahayana Buddhism. According to Comans, eventual Mahayana origins of this term are no more than a possibility, and not a certainty.

Comans also disagrees with Nakamura's thesis that "the fourth realm (caturtha) was perhaps influenced by the Sunyata of Mahayana Buddhism." According to Comans,

Comans further refers to Nakamura himself, who notes that later Mahayana sutras such as the Laṅkāvatāra Sūtra and the concept of Buddha-nature, were influenced by Vedantic thought. Comans concludes that

Jacobs lists adrsta and other terms in more ancient, pre-Buddhist literature such as the Brihadaranyaka Upanishad.

Isaeva states that there are differences in the teachings in the texts of Buddhism and the Mandukya Upanishad of Hinduism, because the latter asserts that citta "consciousness" is identical with the eternal and immutable atman "Self" of the Upanishads. In other words, Mandukya Upanishad and Gaudapada affirm the Self exists, while Buddhist schools affirm that there is no soul or self.KN Jayatilleke (2010), Early Buddhist Theory of Knowledge, pages 246-249, from note 385 onwards;Steven Collins (1994), Religion and Practical Reason (Editors: Frank Reynolds, David Tracy), State Univ of New York Press, page 64; Quote: "Central to Buddhist soteriology is the doctrine of not-self (Pali: anattā, Sanskrit: anātman, the opposed doctrine of ātman is central to Brahmanical thought). Put very briefly, this is the [Buddhist] doctrine that human beings have no soul, no self, no unchanging essence.";Edward Roer (Translator), pages 2-4Katie Javanaud (2013), Is The Buddhist 'No-Self' Doctrine Compatible With Pursuing Nirvana?, Philosophy Now

Reception

Muktika Upanishad
Rama and Hanuman of the Hindu Epic Ramayana, in Muktika Upanishad, discuss moksha (freedom, liberation, deliverance). Rama, therein, recommends Mandukya as first among 108 Upanishads, as follows,

Classical commentators

Gaudapada

One of the first known extant metrical commentary on this Upanishad was written by Gaudapada, This commentary, called the Māndūkya-kārikā, is the earliest known systematic exposition of Advaita Vedanta.

Raju states that Gaudapada took over the Buddhist doctrines that ultimate reality is pure consciousness (vijñapti-mātra), and "the four-cornered negation" (चतुष्कोटि विनिर्मुक्तः). Raju further states that Gaudapada "weaved [both doctrines] into a philosophy of the Mandukaya Upanisad, which was further developed by Shankara". Other scholars such as Murti state, that while there is shared terminology, the doctrines of Gaudapada and Buddhism are fundamentally different.

Adi Shankara
Adi Shankara, a disciple of Govinda Bhagavatpada who himself was either a direct or a distant disciple of Gaudapada, further made commentaries on Gaudapada Mandukya karika, Mandukya Upanishad forms one of the basis of Advaita Vedanta as expounded by Adi Shankara.

Madhvacharya
Madhvacharya, the propounder of Dvaita Vedanta, has written commentaries on Mandukya Upanishad and offers an emotional and theistic perspective of the scripture, and attributes them to Śruti, his commentary based on bhakti yoga and uses Vishnu and his attributes as a similes for deciphering the shlokas of the Mandukya Upanishad 

Modern commentators
According to Aurobindo, Brahman, which has the potentiality of becoming, has created out an existence which has a relation between itself. This existence with its experience of becoming and having relation with the absolute is called as Self or purusha, the principle or power of becoming is called as nature or prakriti.

Swami Rama has provided an interpretation of this Upanishad from the experiential standpoint in his commentary Enlightenment without God.

Ramachandra Dattatrya Ranade calls the aphoristic style of Mandukya Upanishad as highly influential on the Sutras of Indian philosophies that followed it, and that the Upanishad has served as a foundational text of the major Vedanta school of Hinduism. He states,

Ranade's views on the importance of Mandukya Upanishad and Gaudapada's commentary on Vedanta school, particularly Advaita Vedanta sub-school of Hinduism, is shared by modern era scholars such as Hacker, Vetter and others.

Johnston states that Mandukya Upanishad must be read in two layers, consciousness and vehicles of consciousness, Self and nature of Self, the empirical and the eternal. The text aphoristically condenses these layers of message, both in literal and metaphorical sense.

William Butler Yeats, the Irish poet, was inspired by the Upanishads and Mandukya Upanishad was among the texts he commented on.Bruce Wilson (1982), "From Mirror after Mirror: Yeats and Eastern Thought," Comparative Literature, Vol. 34, No. 1, pages 28-46

David Stoll's 1987 Piano Quartet is inspired by three Upanishads, one being Mandukya Upanishad, other two being Katha and Isha Upanishads.

See also

 Adi Shri Gauḍapādāchārya
 Adi Shri Shankaracharya
 Advaita
 Shri Gaudapadacharya Mutt
 Shri Govinda Bhagavatpadacharya

Notes

References

Sources

Published sources

 
 
 
 
 
 
 
 
 
 
 
 
 
 

Web-sources

Further reading
 
Eight Upanishads. Vol.2. With the commentary of Sankaracharya, Tr. By Swami Gambhirananda. Advaita Ashrama, Calcutta, 1990.
V. Krishnamurthy. Essentials of Hinduism. Narosa Publishing House, New Delhi. 1989
Swami Rama. Enlightenment Without God [commentary on Mandukya Upanishad]. Himalayan International Institute of Yoga Science and Philosophy, 1982.
Sri Aurobindo, The Upanishads . Sri Aurobindo Ashram, Pondicherry. 1972.

External links

 https://archive.org/details/MandukyaUpanihadBook Tamil

 The Mandukya Upanishad/Karika, Shankara’s Commentary and Anandagiri’s Tika Translated by Swami Nikhilananda, online ebook
 Mandukya Upanishad Robert Hume (Translator), Oxford University Press
 Multiple translations (Johnston, Nikhilānanda, Dvivedi, Panoli)
 Mandukya Upanishad with Gaudapada Karika
 Part 1 of a Vedanta class by Swami Sarvapriyananda on the Mandukya Upanishad
 Part 2 of a Vedanta class by Swami Sarvapriyananda on the Mandukya Upanishad

Recitation
 Mandukya Upanishad recitation by Pt. Ganesh Vidyalankar
 Downloadable Audio of 44 Classes on Mandukya Upanishad and Gaudapada Karika by Swami TattwamayanandaResources'''
 Video/Audio classes, Reference texts, Discussions and other Study material on Mandukya Upanishad at Vedanta Hub

Upanishads
Advaita Vedanta